In folkloristics, "The Animal as Bridegroom" refers to a group of folk and fairy tales about a human woman marrying or being betrothed to an animal. The animal is revealed to be a human prince in disguise or under a curse. Most of these tales are grouped in the international system of Aarne-Thompson-Uther Index under type ATU 425, "The Search for the Lost Husband". Some subtypes exist in the international classification as independent stories, but they sometimes don't adhere to a fixed typing.

Overview

As consequence of the surge in folktale collecting and the beginnings of folkloristics as a discipline in the 19th century, scholars and folktale collectors compared many versions of "The Animal as Bridegroom" to the tale of Cupid and Psyche.

Folklore scholar Stith Thompson clarified that the animal bridegroom may have been born due to its parents' wishes, or alternates between human and animal shapes. Some tales have the animal son court a princess, but her father demands a brideprice for her.

In some versions, the father surrenders his daughter as his ransom. In others, it is the mother who delivers or promises her daughter(s) to the monster, and it is also by the mother's insistence that the heroine breaks the taboo on her husband: the human heroine must not see him at night, or she must not reveal his true nature to her relatives.

Interpretations
The theme invites all sorts of scholarly and literary interpretations.

Scholar Jack Zipes describes these tale types as a mate selection wherein the human maiden is forced to marry an animal bridegroom as per the insistence of her family or due to her fate. In another work, Zipes writes that, in these tales, the supernatural husband (in animal form) goes through a process of civilizing himself, whereas to the human spouse it represents an initiatory journey.

Researcher Barbara Fass Leavy cited that these tales are interpreted under a feminist reading, which "applauds" the will of the main heroine, in contrast to passive heroines like Snow White and Sleeping Beauty. Leavy, as well as scholar Wendy Doniger, also stated that the "Animal Bridegroom" is the male counterpart of the "Swan Maiden" - both types referring to a marriage between a human person and a mythical being.

Richard MacGillivray Dawkins suggested that its endurance as a myth and a folktale was due to the story "reflect[ing] ... much of the relations of man and wife."

To Donald Ward, type 425 is, on the one hand, an erotic story, the union between divine male sexuality and mortal female virginity, but, on the other hand, also a tale of "love, devotion, and willingness to sacrifice". Similarly, Wendy Doniger sees, in this cycle of tales, a contrast or a "tension" between "the human and the superhuman" (since the animal bridegroom may possess great powers), and between "the animal and the divine".

James M. Taggart stated that these tales underlie a "metaphorical [...] gender division of labor in courtship and marriage": while men take the active role in courtship, and women assume a more passive role, the latter are slotted into a role with "more responsibility" in maintaining the marital status (represented by the trials and ordeals they suffer in these tales).

In her book Off With Their Heads! Fairy Tales and the Culture of Childhood, in the chapter about animal husbands and the human women who marry them, scholar Maria Tatar concludes that the heroine of these tales is part of a complex set of actions and emotions. For instance, Tatar interprets the episode of Psyche's betrayal of Cupid identity (and, by extension, all other heroines and their animal husbands) as a contrast between the heroine's seeking greater intimacy and knowledge of her husband, and her existent attachments to her family - which causes the separation episode.

A line of scholarship (e.g., Boria Sax, James Frazer) associates human-animal marriages to ancient totem ancestry.

Another line of scholarship describes these tales as an initiatory journey for both parties: the husband becomes an animal or wears an animal skin as part of his marriage initiation, while the human wife burns his animal skin and begins her own quest to find her husband as part of hers.

Tale types
Note: the following sections are based on the descriptions of the international Aarne-Thompson-Uther Index. Some information may differ in regional and national folktale indexes.

ATU 425: The Search for the Lost Husband
Folklorist D. L. Ashliman associated this general type with stories wherein the heroine crafts an artificial husband out of raw materials, who becomes a real man and a foreign queen falls in love with him. However, he noted that, among the tales he listed under this classification, some may also fall under type 425A, "Animal as Bridegroom". Folklorist Christine Goldberg named this narrative The Artificial Husband. She also took notice that the heroine, in the "Artificial Husband" tales, is the more active part and initiates the action, unlike the heroines of the other subtypes.
 Pintosmalto
 Master Semolina
 Fairer-than-a-Fairy
 The Ram (fairy tale)
 Prince Swan (de)

ATU 425A: The Animal (Monster) as Bridegroom
In folktales classified as tale type ATU 425A, "The Animal as Bridegroom", the maiden breaks a taboo or burns the husband's animal skin and, to atone, she must wear down a numbered pair of metal shoes. On her way to her husband, she asks for the help of the Sun, the Moon and the Wind, a sequence that researcher Annamaria Zesi suggests is more typical of Northern European tales. In other stories (from Europe, mostly), her helpers may be three old crones, or her husband's relatives.

In some tales, before the separation from her supernatural husband, the wife's children are taken from her and hidden elsewhere. Scholarship locates this motif across Celtic and Germanic speaking areas. Another recurring motif of this type is the drops of blood on the husband's clothes that the heroine washes. Professor Francesca Sautman located this motif in some French variants from Brittany.

Thomas Frederick Crane also noted that, at the end of her journey, she finds her husband at the mercy of a second wife. She bribes this person with items she acquired on the way (given by the personifications of the elements, or from her helpers) to spend a night with him. Only on the third night the heroine manages to talk to her husband and he recognizes her. In this regard, Sautman noted that the heroine may be given three nuts (alternatively, almonds and chestnuts) that contain the objects she will use to bribe the false bride. Furthermore, according to Anna Angelopoulou and Aigle Broskou, editors of the Greek Folktale Catalogue, alternate gifts for the heroine may be related to weaving (such as a loom or a spindle), or beautiful dresses representing the Sun, the Moon and stars, or the sea, the land and the skies.

According to Hans-Jörg Uther, the main feature of tale type ATU 425A is "bribing the false bride for three nights with the husband". In fact, when he developed his revision of Aarne-Thompson's system, Uther remarked that an "essential" trait of the tale type ATU 425A was the "wife's quest and gifts" and "nights bought".
Black Bull of Norroway
The Brown Bear of Norway
The Daughter of the Skies
The Tale of the Hoodie 
The Three Daughters of King O'Hara
The Sprig of Rosemary
The Enchanted Snake
White-Bear-King-Valemon
East of the Sun and West of the Moon
Prince Hat under the Ground
The Iron Stove
The Enchanted Pig (ATU 441 and ATU 425A)
Whitebear Whittington
The Serpent Prince
Sigurd, the King's Son (Icelandic fairy tale)
The White Wolf
Trandafiru
Again, The Snake Bridegroom
Prince Crawfish
King Crin (Italian fairy tale)

ATU 425B: Son of the Witch (The Witch's Tasks)

This category of tales involves the heroine performing difficult tasks for her husband's family (more specifically, her mother-in-law). In this type, the heroine reaches the house of a witch (sometimes, her mother-in-law; sometimes, another female relative of her husband), where she works as her servant. One of the tasks is to go to another witch's house, and fetch from there a box, a casket, a bag, a sack of something that her husband warns not to open, but she does.

Richard MacGillivray Dawkins also noted that, in some tales, the mother-in-law, to further humiliate the heroine, betrothes her son to another bride and sends her on errands to get materials for the upcoming wedding. Jack Zipes emphasizes that the heroine must perform the tasks before she has a chance to free her husband.

In some tales, the heroine is forced to carry torches to her husband's marriage cortège - a practice that Zipes and  relate to an ancient Roman custom mentioned by Plautus in his work Casina. According to Donald Ward, Swedish scholar Jan-Öjvind Swahn stated that his type A, "the oldest" (see below), contains the motif of the heroine holding a torch to her husband's second marriage to the false bride - a trap set by the witch or her daughter with the intent to kill the heroine. However, she is saved when her husband takes the torch and drops into the false bride's hands. Jan-Öjvind Swahn named this The Torch Motif and located it in tales from Scandinavia, Greece, India, Turkey, and Romance-speaking areas.

This type may be conflated with the previous one. However, Uther argues that the distinction between both categories lies in "the quest for the casket" and the visit to the second witch. Researcher Annamaria Zesi suggests that the motif of obtaining the box from the witch occurs in Eastern Mediterranean variants. As for the motif of the "visit to the second witch", Catalan scholarship locates its distribution in variants from Latvia, Finland, Germany, Iceland, France, Italy, Turkey, and Serbia.

According to Christine Goldberg and Walter Puchner, some variants of this type show as a closing episode "The Magic Flight" sequence, a combination that appears "sporadically in Europe", but "traditionally in Turkey". This episode also appears in the Bulgarian type 425B, "Момъкът с конската глава" or "Der Junge mit Pferdekopf" ("The Youth With the Horse's Head").

A related tale type is type AaTh 428, "The Wolf", considered by scholars as a fragmentary version of the tale of Cupid and Psyche, lacking the initial part about the animal husband and corresponding to the part of the witch's tasks. Accordingly, Uther revised the international classification system and subsumed previous type AaTh 428, "The Wolf" under the new type ATU 425B, "Son of the Witch".

Cupid and Psyche
Graciosa and Percinet
The Green Serpent
The King of Love
Ulv Kongesøn (Prince Wolf)
The Golden Root
The Horse-Devil and the Witch
Tulisa, the Wood-Cutter's Daughter
 Khastakhumar and Bibinagar
 Habrmani
 The Son of the Ogress
 The Tale of the Woodcutter and his Daughters (ATU 425B and ATU 425D)
 Yasmin and the Serpent Prince
 The Little Crab
 Pájaro Verde
 The Story of the Abandoned Princess
 Prunella (AaTh 428)
 The Little Girl Sold with the Pears (AaTh 428)
 La Fada Morgana (AaTh 428)
 The Tale about Baba-Yaga
 The Man and the Girl at the Underground Mansion (AaTh 428)

ATU 425C: Beauty and the Beast

Zipes summarized the tale thus: the third or youngest daughter asks her father (a merchant or king) for a gift (bird or flower). The only place he can find such a trifle is the garden of the beast or monster, who demands the merchant/king's daughter in return. Richard MacGillivray Dawkins, in turn, remarked that the heroine's sisters asked their father for material possessions (e.g., dresses), whereas she asks for a simple token that will lead her to the enchanted prince.

Uther remarks that this type contains the "presents for the daughters", lacking, however, a quest for the lost spouse.
Beauty and the Beast
The Singing, Springing Lark (ATU 425C and ATU 425A)
The Small-tooth Dog
The Scarlet Flower

ATU 425D: The Vanished Husband
In this tale type, the husband disappears and the human wife builds an inn (alternatively, a hostel, bath house, or hospital) to receive strangers. Every guest must share a story with her. She then listens to a story told by the stranger and recognizes it is about where she can find her husband.

Greek scholars Anna Angelopoulou and Aigle Broskou remark that the breaking of the taboo by the wife in this tale type involves revealing the husband's identity during a party or a tournament. They also state that the motif of building an inn to help locate the missing spouse also happens in the 14th-century Byzantine romance of Libistros and Rodamni (or Livistros and Rhodamné).
The Golden Crab

ATU 425E: Enchanted Husband Sings Lullaby
In this tale type, the heroine is pregnant when her husband disappears and goes on a quest for him. She arrives at a castle, whose owner, a queen, lets her stay in. The heroine gives birth to her child. One night, someone comes in and sings a lullaby to the baby. The heroine recognizes this person as her husband, and his song contains instructions on how to save him (either from his animal curse or from the grasp of the fairies).

Croatian folklorist Maja Bošković-Stulli reported a Serbo-Croatian epic song titled The Falcon Groom: a princess is locked up in a tower by her father, intending to avoid a prophecy. A prince in falcon form enters the tower and falls in love with her. She becomes pregnant, leaves the tower and goes to the falcon groom's mother's castle to give birth to their son. When the falcon groom appears at night to rock his child, he sings a lullaby on how to disenchant him.

 The Padlock
 Filek-Zelebi

Related types
Academic Thomas Frederick Crane noted another set of tales which he called "The Animal Children": sometimes, the inhuman/animal suitor is born out of a hasty wish of their parents, or adopted by a human couple in their current beastly form. When the animal suitor grows up, he wishes for his parents to find a woman of marriageable age. In some variants, the animal groom is given a different bride or marries other women before the heroine, and he devours, hurts or kills these brides while still in animal form. It is only the third wife that burns the animal skin and disenchants him.

This narrative may appear in the following tale types:
 ATU 430, "Donkey as Bridegroom" (prince as a donkey)
 ATU 433B, "King Lindworm" (prince as a lindworm)
 ATU 441, "In Enchanted Skin" or "Hans My Hedgehog" (prince as pig or hedgehog)

Other fiction
The Sleeping Prince (fairy tale) (AaTh 425G)
Eglė the Queen of Serpents (ATU 425M)
 The Story of Princess Zeineb and King Leopard (AaTh 425N)
Snow-White and Rose-Red (ATU 426)
The Hut in the Forest (ATU 431)
Prince as Bird (ATU 432)
The Frog Prince (ATU 440)
The Old Woman in the Wood (ATU 442)
 (ATU 449) 
The Crow (fairy tale)
Princess Himal and Nagaray
The Snake Prince
Champavati
 The Turtle Prince
 The Fisher-Girl and the Crab
 The Ruby Prince (Punjabi folktale)
Monyohe (Sotho)
Umamba (Zulu folktale)
Baemsillang (The Serpent Husband)
Amewakahiko soshi
 The Pretty Little Calf
 The King of the Snakes
 The Snail Son
 The White Bird and His Wife
 Fairer-than-a-Fairy (Caumont de La Force)

Distribution
According to Karen Bamford, more than 1,500 variants of the tale have been collected from Europe, Asia, Africa and North America (in the latter, derived from European traditions). Israeli professor  reported 580 variants across six European countries: Sweden, Norway, Ireland, Germany, France and Italy.

Possible developments
According to 's monograph, the main tale type (Cupid and Psyche) is "commonest in Scandinavia and eastern Mediterranean", but also appears in Europe, Asia Minor, Persia, India, Indonesia and in Africa ("among the Berbers and Hausa"). Megas complements Swahn's analysis and locates type A across the Mediterranean, and even in China. Swahn hypothesized that the original tale of Cupid and Psyche might have developed in the Eastern Mediterranean, an area that encapsulates Southern Italy, Sicily, Greece and Turkey.

In regards to the type of "buying three nights" (Swahn's type B), Swahn suggested that this sequence was an "innovation" on the main type (Cupid and Psyche), and "belongs to France", because it either developed among the Bretons or in France proper under influence of Breton motifs. From there it diffused to the whole of Europe and Asia Minor, appearing "particularly" in Ireland, Denmark and Norway. The type with the three nights, Swahn acknowledged, was the one to spread far and wide. Later scholarship corroborates Swahn's assessment: "Animal as Bridegroom" tales with the "buying three nights" episode are very popular in Germanic-, Celtic-, Slavic- and Romance-speaking areas.

About a small cycle of stories that involves the "three nights" and "the artificial husband", Swahn believed that it must have developed in Italy, since tales with the artificial husband seem restricted to Turkey, Italy and Greece. An opposite view is held by Greek folklorist Georgios A. Megas, to whom the two motifs have been merged in Greek tradition.

Greek folklorist  argued for a transmission of type 425D from the East to the West by the Crusaders. Fellow scholars Anna Angelopoulou and Aigle Broskou remark that tale type 425D is popular in both Greece and Turkey, and from the latter spread to Egypt, Iran and Tunisia.

Footnotes

References

Bibliography

 Aarne, Antti; Thompson, Stith. The types of the folktale: a classification and bibliography. Third Printing. Folklore Fellows Communications FFC no. 184. Helsinki: Academia Scientiarum Fennica, 1973 [1961]. pp. 140–151.
 
 
 
 Swahn, Jan Öjvind. The Tale of Cupid and Psyche. Lund, C.W.K. Gleerup. 1955.
 
 "Choosing the Right Mate: Why Beasts and Frogs Make for Ideal Husbands". In: Zipes, Jack. The Enchanted Screen: The Unknown History of Fairy-Tale Films. London and New York: Routledge. 2011. pp. 224–251. .

Further reading

 
 
 Heiner, Heidi Anne (editor). Beauty and the Beast Tales From Around the World. Surlalune Fairy Tale. CreateSpace Independent Publishing Platform; Annotated edition (October 8, 2013). .
 
 Le Guern-Camara, Gaëlle. "D’Éros à la Bête: la chambre des secrets" [From Eros to the Beast: the chamber of secrets]. In: Féeries [En ligne], 16 | 2020, mis en ligne le 07 janvier 2021, consulté le 27 janvier 2023. URL: http://journals.openedition.org/feeries/2842; 
 Marjanić, Suzana. "Genre (and) Interpretations: Fables, Tales of Animal Bridegrooms (The Beauty and the Beast Archetype) and Animal Wives, and the Interpretations Thereof". In: Disenchantment, Re-Enchantment and Folklore Genres. Edited by Nemanja Radulović and Smiljana Đorđević Belić. Belgrade: Institute for Literature and Arts, 2021. pp. 121–139.
 . "Romeo Moses and Psyche Brunhild? Or Cupid the Serpent and the Morning Star?" In: Caucasologie et mythologie comparée, Actes du Colloque international du C.N.R.S. - IVe Colloque de Caucasologie (Sèvres, 27-29 juin 1988). Paris, PEETERS, 1992. pp. 177–185. .

External links
Other tales of type ATU 425A on Surlalune Fairy Tales (by Heidi Anne Heiner)
Other tales of type ATU 425C by D. L. Ashliman
Other tales of type ATU 425C on Surlalune Fairy Tales (by Heidi Anne Heiner)

Classification systems
Folklore studies
Literary criticism
Fictional princes
Fiction about shapeshifting
Female characters in fairy tales
ATU 400-459